Fero or Feró is a given name and family name, and may refer to:

Given name

Fero
Fero is a nickname for Ferario and František:

 Ferario Spasov (born 1962), Bulgarian football coach and manager
 Fero, Kosovo-Albanian rapper

 František Velecký (1934–2003), Slovak actor
Fero is a nickname for Farzad

Feró 
Feró is a Hungarian nickname for Ferenc:
 Feró Nagy (born 1946), Hungarian rock singer and musician

Family name 
 Ken Fero, a UK documentary filmmaker and political activist

Novel 
 Fero, a Gujarati novel written by  Radheshyam Sharma

Ships 
 Ferö, an occasional spelling of the Danish ship Færøe

See also 
 Faroe (disambiguation)
 Ferro (disambiguation)

Informal personal names
Slovak masculine given names